Merrivale is a placename:
South Africa
 Merrivale, KwaZulu-Natal is a small town in the midlands of KwaZulu-Natal Province
 Merrivale, Gauteng was a small gold mining town in Gauteng but now a military facility.
 Merrivale, Durban is a suburb of Durban
United Kingdom
 Merrivale, Devon, hamlet with nearby neolithic stone rows (formerly also spelled Merivale)
 Merrivale, Herefordshire, a suburb of Ross-on-Wye

See also
Merivale (disambiguation)
Merivale (surname)